The Winhall River is an  tributary of the West River in Windham and Bennington counties, Vermont, in the United States.

The Winhall River rises near the western boundary of the town of Stratton near the crest of the Green Mountains.  The river flows north, forming the eastern boundary of the Lye Brook Wilderness of the Green Mountain National Forest.  It is crossed by the Appalachian Trail along this section. The river then turns east, dropping out of the high ground of the Green Mountains and passing through the town of Winhall. The river flows through the northern corner of the town of Jamaica, then enters Londonderry, where it enters the West River in Ball Mountain Reservoir.

See also
List of rivers of Vermont

References 

Rivers of Vermont
Tributaries of the Connecticut River
Rivers of Bennington County, Vermont
Rivers of Windham County, Vermont